Làyuè is the last month of the year in the Chinese calendar. In general, the Great Cold is in Làyuè. The name comes from the winter sacrifice, just as February. In Japan, the month is not called Layue but Shiwasu (literally 'priests' busiest month')

Festival
The Laba Festival, is Làyuè 8th. The following Laba Festival is at January 24, 2018. The original define of the Laba festival is the day of the winter sacrifice(), and the date is the third Wùrì after the Winter Solstice.
The Preliminary Eve (Chinese: 小年) is Làyuè 23rd or 24th.The following preliminary eve is at February 8, 2018 in North China, and at February 9, 2018 in South China.
The New Year's Eve (Chinese: 除夕) is the last day of the year, Làyuè 29th or 30th. The following New Year's Eve is at February 15, 2018, which is a statutory holiday.

Events
Aisin-Gioro Puyi, 12th Qing Emperor of China, issued the imperial abdication edict at Làyuè 25th 1911

Birth
Emperor Go-Uda, the 91st emperor of Japan, Shiwasu 1st 1269
Tokugawa Ieyasu,  the founder and first shōgun of the Tokugawa shogunate of Japan, Shiwasu 26th 1542
Uemura Masahisa, a Japanese Christian pastor, theologian and critic of Meiji and Taishō periods, Shiwasu 1st 1857
Imperial Noble Consort Shushen,  an Imperial concubine of the Tongzhi Emperor, Làyuè 1st 1859

Death
Yue Fei, Yue Yun, Zhang Xian, military generals who lived in the Southern Song dynasty, Làyuè 29th 1141
Lu You, a prominent poet of China's Southern Song Dynasty, Làyuè 29th 1209
Emperor Go-Hanazono, the 102nd emperor of Japan, Shiwasu 27th 1470
Lê Uy Mục,  the eighth king of the later Lê dynasty of Vietnam, Làyuè 1st 1509
Yi Gwang-sik, a Korean politician and general during the Joseon Dynasty, Làyuè 1st 1563

Chinese calendars